Lorenzo Lyons or "Makua Laiana" (April 18, 1807 – October 6, 1886) was an early missionary to the Kingdom of Hawaii. He was a songwriter who wrote the lyrics of "Hawaii Aloha", which was inducted into the Hawaiian Music Hall of Fame in 1998. Lyons spent the last 28 years of his life as postmaster in the district surrounding Waimea, Hawaii County, Hawaii.

Early life
He was born in Colrain, Franklin County, Massachusetts, April 18, 1807. He graduated from Union College in 1827. Ordained as a Congregationalist minister at Auburn Theological Seminary, September 20, 1831.

Missionary in Hawaii
He embarked from Boston, Massachusetts on November 26, 1831, on the Averick with his wife Betsy Curtis (1813–1837). Part of the fifth company from the American Board of Commissioners for Foreign Missions, they arrived in the South Kohala district of the island of Hawaii on May 17, 1832.

He spent the remainder of his life dedicated to the native Hawaiians.

His Waimea parish eventually included the districts of Kohala and Hāmākua, making it the largest mission station in Hawaii.

During his tenure, Lyons was responsible for the erection of fourteen churches, such as Imiola Church where he is buried. He was district postmaster from 1858 until his death.

Songwriter
He was fluent in the Hawaiian language and composed many poems and hymns; his best known and beloved work is the hymn "Hawaii Aloha" sung to the tune of "I Left it All With Jesus."

Family
Rev. Lyons died on October 6, 1886, and is buried at Imiola Church Cemetery in Waimea, Hawaii County, Hawaii.

His first wife died in 1837, and he married Lucia G. Smith of Truxton, New York on July 14, 1838.

Son Curtis Jere Lyons was born June 27, 1833, attended Punahou School and graduated from Williams College in 1858. After attending Union Theological Seminary for two years, he returned to Hawaii and became a reporter. In 1868 and 1870 he was elected to the legislature of the Hawaiian Kingdom, and married Julia E. Vernon on April 23, 1873. He died on September 24, 1914.

Son Albert B. Lyons (1841-1926) was the founding secretary of the scientific section of the American Pharmaceutical Association.

Legacy
Samoan writer John Kneubuhl wrote a play based on his life titled "The Harp in the Willows" in 1946. It was one of the first published works to use Hawaiian Creole English (known outside of academic circles as "pidgin" or "pidgin English").

See also
Millerism
List of Missionaries to Hawaii

References

1807 births
1886 deaths
People from Colrain, Massachusetts
American Congregationalist ministers
Congregationalist missionaries in Hawaii
American Congregationalist missionaries
American hymnwriters
American expatriates in the Hawaiian Kingdom
People from Hawaii (island)
Auburn Theological Seminary alumni
Union College (New York) alumni
19th-century American musicians
19th-century American clergy